Vincent Bioulès is a French painter, born on March 5, 1938 in Montpellier, where he lives and works.

Biography 
Bioulès was born and continues to live and work in Montpellier. 

He has taught at several Fine Art schools including Ecole Nationale Superieure des Beaux Arts in Paris.

Work 
In 1966 Vincent Bioulès participated in the “Impact” exhibition in Céret ( Pyrénées-Orientales ).

Vincent Bioulès was one of the founders of the Supports/Surfaces movement in 1968. Unlike many of the other artists of the group, Bioulès never renounced the stretched canvas. His focus in the group was to work the surfaces and accentuate the notion of its extent rather thatn its materialtiy.  

In 1969, he founded the ABC Productions group with Tjeerd Alkema, Jean Azemard, Alain Clément and Patrice Vermeille.

He left the Supports/Surfaces group in 1972

In the mid-70s, he transitioned from abstraction to figurative painting, through portraiture and landscape. His panoramas come from mnemonic images.

Selected Exhibitions

Solo Exhibitions 

2006

 Espace et Paysage, 1966-2006, Musée d’Art Moderne de Céret, Céret, France

1992

 Nues, Musée d'Art Moderne, Saint-Etienne, France

Group Exhibitions 

2019

 Unfurled: Supports/ Surfaces 1966-1976, curated by Wallace Whitney, MOCAD, Detroit, USA

2018

 ART PARIS ART FAIR, Grand Palais, Paris, France

1998

 Les Années Supports / Surfaces dans les collections du centre Georges Pompidou, Musée du -2000, Jeu de Paume, Paris, France

1970

 Support(s)-Surface(s), ARC, musée d’Art moderne de la Ville de Paris, France

1966

 Jeunes peintres de l’école de Montpellier, musée Fabre, Montpellier, France.

Public Collection 

 Centre national des arts plastiques, Paris, France

 Musée d’art moderne de Céret, France

 Frac Occitanie, Montpellier, France

 Musée national d’art moderne - centre Pompidou, Paris, France

 Centre communal d’art contemporain, Marseille, France

 Musée d’Art moderne et d’Art contemporain de Nice, France

 Les Abattoirs, Toulouse, France

 Musée d’art moderne et contemporain, Saint-Etienne, France

 Frac Ile de France, Paris, France

 CAPC Musée d’art contemporain de Bordeaux, France

 Frac Franche-Comté, Besançon, France

 Frac Provence-Alpes- Côtes d’Azur : Collection, Marseille

 Collection Institut d’Art contemporain, Rhône-Alpes, Villeurbanne, France

 Musée d’art Moderne et contemporain, Strasbourg, France

References 

1938 births
Living people
21st-century French male artists
20th-century French male artists
21st-century French painters
20th-century French painters
French male painters
Artists from Montpellier
Academic staff of the École des Beaux-Arts